= Periodic lateralized epileptiform discharges =

Periodic lateralized epileptiform discharges are a type of EEG abnormality. They are one of the most frequent paroxystic complexes. They are basically triphasic with sharply contoured wave followed by a slow wave mostly occurring unilaterally with duration 100-300 msec and amplitude 100-300 often present with fast rhythm between discharges. In recent literature it is referred to as Lateralized periodic discharges.
